The Röddinge Formation is a geologic formation in Skåne County, southern Sweden. It is Early Jurassic (Sinemurian-Toarcian) in age. It is a unit with a limited degree of exposure, being identified mostly by its deposits on the Fyledalen Fault Zone, specially on Kurremölla, where is present the main fossil deposit. It is a unit known mostly for large museum collections and estimated to have a thickness of several hundreds of meters. It is also known for its large iron deposits. It is correlated with the mostly marine Rya Formation of western Skåne County, the Volcanic deposits of the Djupadal Formation and specially the Sorthat Formation of Bornholm. Most likely, the coarse-grained nature of the Röddinge Formation is linked to rapid erosion of a tectonically active hinterland.

Lithology
A profile up to 300 m thick was described in 1968 from the Eriksdal-Kurremölla area, dated Pliensbachian-Toarcian. The Pliensbachian levels where dominated by sands and sandstones of marine origin, hosting a highly fossiliferous bed containing a rich mollusc fauna. A Sinemurian layer assigned to the formation was also found on other works.
The Röddinge formation has a great abundance of Limonite and Chamosite quartz arenites, fine-to medium-grained, with subordinate thin conglomerates. Sediments related to the unit are found consolidated by Berthierine or Siderite cement, with berthierine oolites being common on the layers. These ooids are rather small on most of the successions, around 0.3 mm in diameter and ellipsoidal in shape, having cores composed by detrital quartz or heavy minerals. The deposits of the formation evidence strong degradation by modern weathering and have a red, brown or yellow stain (iron hydroxides). The deposits not affected by erosion are known from boreholes and host greyish dark green facies due to the content of berthierine and siderite. The iron contents differ based on the weathering grade of the layers: on weathered sandstones is about 8–10%, then is in up to 20% in the oolites, and finally at the major fossiliferous deposit on Kurremölla a 1.7 m thick oolite bed has an iron content of up to 35%. Owing to this high content in iron, the Kurremölla locality was mined from 1930 to 1937, although there was not enough iron supply and enrichments were too dispersed in the source rock, which led to it not being economically viable to maintain the mining process for very long. The presence of mostly poor exposures has made mostly impossible to do detailed facies analysis, although it is suggested that the sediments come from prolonged reworking.

Fossils
The Röddinge formation is considered mostly a coeval developing unit with the Jurassic formations of Bornholm, as both where connected as part of the Fennoscandian mainland. The unit is considered to be part of the fluvial to deltaic system found also or Bornholm. However, as happened on the Hasle Formation, the Röddinge formation hosted a major marine ingression at least on the Lower-Middle Pliensbachian (jamesoni subzone), with both sharing the Ammonite fauna and the ecosystems. The main fossiliferous content of the formation comes from marine influence, clearly indicated by finds of ammonites and crinoids. After this event, in the Toarcian the formation developed along the Sorthat Formation, forming both part of the large deltaic system that ended on northern Germany. There is also suggestions that towards the west a lake system was developed, covering the marine basin after the local Late Pliensbachian-Lower Toarcian regression. This lake system is evidenced on several boreholes, and was probably developed on the western lateral of the major fluvial system recorded locally and on Bornholm. Like the Sorthat Formation, this upper unit also hosts possible coal beds. Both, the lake and the fluvial system layers host iron ooids that indicate diagenetic precipitation, prior to and during sediment compaction.  This is also found on the Rydebäck and Katslösa Members of the Rya Formation, and has been suggested that the volcanic activity developed on the coeval Djupadal Formation may have stimulated the process.

Annelida

Echinodermata

Bivalves

Gastropoda

Cephalopoda

Chondrichthyes

See also 
 List of fossiliferous stratigraphic units in Sweden
 Kristianstad Basin
 Toarcian formations

 Rya Formation, Sweden
 Marne di Monte Serrone, Italy
 Calcare di Sogno, Italy
 Sachrang Formation, Austria
 Saubach Formation, Austria
 Posidonia Shale, Lagerstätte in Germany
 Ciechocinek Formation, Germany and Poland
 Krempachy Marl Formation, Poland and Slovakia
 Lava Formation, Lithuania

References 

Geologic formations of Sweden
Jurassic System of Europe
Early Jurassic Europe
Jurassic Sweden
Pliensbachian Stage
Toarcian Stage
Sandstone formations
Coal formations
Coal in Sweden
Paleontology in Sweden